25–29 High Petergate is a grade II* listed terrace in the city centre of York, in England.

The terrace lies on High Petergate, one of the main streets in York.  27 and 29 were designed by John and George Bowes and completed by 1701, while 25 was added in 1707.  All three are three stories high, with an attic, and built of orange brick, on a stone plinth.  Each is of a different width: 25 is five bays wide, 27 two bays, and 29 four bays.  The centre bay of 25 is slightly forward of the rest of the facade.

Internally, the original staircase of 29 High Petergate survives, while 25 has an early-19th century staircase, and 27 was entirely refitted in the 19th-century.  27 also has some stained glass, designed by Thomas Hodgson in 1801.  The front doors all date from around 1800.  At the back, all three have gables: curved on 25, and Dutch on 27 and 29.

The three buildings are in commercial use.  25 High Petergate is the Guy Fawkes Hotel, which has a plaque installed by the York Dungeon claiming that Guy Fawkes was born on the site.  However, there is no evidence of this, and the York Civic Trust instead argues that he was born on nearby Stonegate.

References

High Petergate 25-29
Houses completed in 1701
Houses completed in 1707
Houses in North Yorkshire
High Petergate 25-29